The Finlay tephras are two tephra deposits in northern British Columbia, Canada. They take their name from the Finley River and were deposited just before 10,220–10,560 years ago. The source for the two tephra deposits is unknown but were likely erupted during two closely spaced periods of volcanism at one or two volcanoes associated with the Northern Cordilleran Volcanic Province. Volcanoes suggested to have erupted the tephras include Hoodoo Mountain, Heart Peaks, the Mount Edziza volcanic complex and Level Mountain.

See also
Volcanism of Western Canada

References

Igneous petrology
Tephra
Prehistoric volcanic events
Northern Cordilleran Volcanic Province
Natural history of British Columbia
Holocene volcanism
Volcanic eruptions in Canada